Northampton Corporation Tramways operated the tramway service in Northampton between 1901 and 1934.

History
The company was purchased from the Northampton Street Tramways Company on 21 October 1901 for the sum of £38,700. It continued to operate horse drawn tramcars whilst the electrification work was planned. Once the elecric services were ready, the horse drawn assets were quickly disposed of at auctions run by W.J. Pierce in Northampton. Seventy horses and 6 tramcars were sold on 29 July 1904. The remaining 15 horses and 8 tramcars which had been held over to work the Kingsthorpe section were sold at auction in August 1904. The Duke of Buccleuch paid 38 guineas for a bay gelding, and the remaining horses sold for between 14 guineas and 30 guineas. The tramcars (originally purchased for £150 to £170 each) sold for between £4 and £7 each.

The back of the building was closed with a temporary end to provide for future extensions. The power generating station was constructed at the refuse destructor site in Castle Street. The generating station was equipped with two 200 kW sets in duplicate with a 120 kW set for taking light loads. Construction of both started in October 1903. 

The work of converting the permanent way into an electric tramway system started on 20 January 1904 when contractors began to lay new lines on Wellingborough Road. The first electric service started on Thursday 21 July 1904 when an inauguration ceremony was held in Mercers’ Row. The inaugural car carried the Mayoress and departed along Abington Street to St Matthew’s Church, followed by two other cars. They then returned and ran to the other terminus at Franklin’s Gardens. By the end of the day all 20 cars were running in service.

In 1913 the Council approved a report from the Tramways Committee which recommended the expenditure of £10,850 for the purchase of additional plant and tramcars. The cost of four new tramcars was put at £2,600, the extension to the sheds was £2,400, an engine and generator for £2,300 and battery for £2,100. The tram service was now carrying 7,500,000 passengers per annum, compared with 5,000,000 in 1906.

The extension to Far Cotton was built for the sum of £20,352 11s 10d by Messrs Stark and Co of Glasgow. The cost of widening the bridge was between £6,000 and £7,000. The new line to Far Cotton opened on 23 October 1914.

The First World War resulted in some restrictions in services. The halfpenny fare was abolished but it was agreed that wounded soldiers in blue uniforms would be allowed to ride free of charge. Like many tramways, the company struggled with the recruitment of male tramway employees into the armed forces and on 20 December 1915 the first female conductors were employed. The women were employed on a contract to work 54 hours per week and they were paid at the same rate as men conductors, £1 0s. 3d.. Towards the end of the war it was reported that some of the women were working 70 hours per week due to the prevalence of sickness and consequent lost time. 

Sunday service was re-introduced in 1919.

There was some financial difficulty after the war, in 1919 the losses were reported as £2,447 on expenditure of £50,058, and by 1921 losses had increased to £8,900. However, by 1924 the situation had improved and a profit of £9,000 was reported.

Fleet

There were 37 tramcars in the Northampton fleet:
1-20 built in 1904 by Electric Railway & Tramway Carriage Works
21-22 built in 1905 by Electric Railway & Tramway Carriage Works
23-24 built in 1910 by United Electric Car Company
25-26 built in 1911 by United Electric Car Company
27-33 built in 1914 by Brush Electrical Machines
34-37 built in 1921 by English Electric

The livery was vermilion and white.

Closure

The system was closed on 15 December 1934.

Two tram stops survive in Northampton. One is near the Racecourse and the other is on Kingsthorpe Grove.

References

External links
 Northampton Corporation Tramways at British Tramway Company Badges and Buttons

Tram transport in England
Rail transport in Northamptonshire
1901 establishments in England
1934 disestablishments in England
3 ft 6 in gauge railways in England
British companies disestablished in 1934
British companies established in 1901